Elbridge may refer to several places:

Places
In the United States
 Elbridge Township, Edgar County, Illinois
 Elbridge Township, Michigan
 Elbridge, New York, town
 Elbridge (village), New York

Canada
 Elbridge, Alberta

See also
 Elbridge (given name)